{{DISPLAYTITLE:C7H9N}}
The molecular formula C7H9N may refer to:

 Benzylamine
 Lutidines (dimethylpyridines)
 2,4-Lutidine
 2,6-Lutidine
 3,5-Lutidine
 N-Methylaniline
 Toluidines
 o-Toluidine
 m-Toluidine
 p-Toluidine